Tassiga  is a village and seat of the Commune of Bourra in the Cercle of Ansongo in the Gao Region of south-eastern Mali. The village lies on the left (east) bank of the Niger River, 37 km southeast of the town of Ansongo.

References

Populated places in Gao Region